Jacques de Chammard (1 January 1888—25 December 1983) was a French politician.

He was a member of the Radical-Socialist and Radical Republican Party, and served as mayors of Tulle from 1925 to 1943. He was also re-elected to the mayors of Tulle. He later joined the party in Democratic gauche from 1938 to 1940. He was vice-president of the chamber of deputies from 1934 to 1936, and general councilor of the department from 1935.

Biography
Jacques was born in Tulle, France on 1888 and died in Tulle, France on 1983 at the age of 95. Jacques de Chammard studies law qualified as brilliant and joins the prefectural administration as sub-prefect. He was also becomes mayor of his hometown.

References 

1888 births
1983 deaths
People from Tulle
radical Party (France) politicians
Members of the 13th Chamber of Deputies of the French Third Republic
Members of the 14th Chamber of Deputies of the French Third Republic
Members of the 15th Chamber of Deputies of the French Third Republic
French Senators of the Third Republic
Mayors of places in Nouvelle-Aquitaine